Sawai Man Singh Hospital is the major hospital of Jaipur and Rajasthan state of India. This government hospital is  staffed with 1500 doctors and 4000 nurses with 6251 beds in 43 wards and daily more than 10000 OPD.In fact it surpassed AIIMS Delhi in terms of number of patients in OPD and surgeries. The construction of the hospital building began in 1934. The hospital is named after Sawai Man Singh II, then King of Jaipur. The hospital also provides practical training to the students of the Sawai Man Singh Medical College. SMS hospital is under pressure due to a large number of patients and rare diseased patients from across the state as it is one of the few government super speciality hospitals.

Presently, there are over 168 beds in intensive care units and 51 in semi-intensive care units of the hospital. But the shortage of nursing staff is a concern in intensive care units. The ratio of nursing staff in intensive care units is one nurse per 6-7 beds at the hospital. However, it has been recommended that there should be one nurse for two patients in intensive care units. It is recognised as one of the best hospitals in India, with many faculties working all over the world. It was this hospital which acted very fast on COVID-19 in its initial phase in 2020. Robot will now treat cancer like disease in Sawai Mansingh Hospital.

Speciality centers

Birla Cancer Center 

The center was established in 1987 by donation from Mr. Radha Kishan Birla of Pilani.  Additions were made to the center in 1991 and 2007 (being a BMT unit and OTs).

Rehabilitation and Research Center 

The Department of Physical Medicine and Rehabilitation (Rehabilitation and Research Center) is one of the oldest and largest rehabilitation departments in India.  This department was established in 1977 under the guidance of Dr P. K. Sethi.  It comprises two units and provides physiotherapy, occupational therapy, and orthotics/prosthetics services.

Bangur Bhawan 

Bangur Bhawan comprises two units of cardiac surgery and one unit of cardiology.

Charak Bhawan 

Charak Bhawan was constructed in response to growing numbers of ENT and eye patients.  The block was inaugurated by then Hon’ble Chief Minister Mrs. Vasundhra Raje in year 2008. This new block is located in south-west part of the hospital.

References

External links
 jaipur
 SMS Hospital Report
 best Cancer Surgeon in Jaipur

Hospital buildings completed in 1934
Buildings and structures in Jaipur
Hospitals in Rajasthan
1934 establishments in India
Hospitals established in 1934
20th-century architecture in India